Rhodacaropsis is a genus of mites in the family Rhodacaridae. There are about six described species in Rhodacaropsis.

Species
These six species belong to the genus Rhodacaropsis:
 Rhodacaropsis attenuatus (Loots, 1969)
 Rhodacaropsis botosaneanui (Petrova & Beron, 1973)
 Rhodacaropsis cheungae Luxton, 1992
 Rhodacaropsis cubanus (Petrova & Beron, 1973)
 Rhodacaropsis inexpectatus Willmann, 1935
 Rhodacaropsis ponticus Shcherbak, 1980

References

Acari